The Miss Slovenia is a national Beauty pageant in Slovenia. Miss Slovenia is not related to the previous Miss Universe Slovenia.

History
Vesna Musić was crowned the first Miss Slovenia in 1990.
In 1992, Slovenia began to participate in the Miss World pageant, Nataša Abram, Miss Slovenia 1992, was the first Miss Slovenia presented at Miss World Pageant.

Titleholders
Color key

The winner of Miss Slovenije represents her country at Miss World. On occasion, when the winner does not qualify (due to age) for either contest, a runner-up is sent.

Winner by Municipalities

By Geographical regions
As of 2011:

References

External links
Official website of Miss Slovenia
ULTIMO IMPERIO

Beauty pageants in Slovenia
Recurring events established in 1990
Slovenian awards